Mittonia is a genus of snout moths described by Paul Ernest Sutton Whalley in 1964.

Species
 Mittonia carcassoni Whalley, 1964
 Mittonia hampsoni (Distant, 1897)

References

Pyralinae
Pyralidae genera